Peter Stewart Hyndman (October 9, 1941– September 6, 2006) was a Canadian politician and lawyer.

Hyndman graduated from law at the University of British Columbia and studied economics at Harvard University.  He was the MLA for Vancouver South from 1979 to 1983, and was Minister of Consumer and Corporate Affairs from 1981 to 1982 in the cabinet of Bill Bennett.  He was forced out of office by an expense-account scandal in 1982. Hyndman died of cancer at the age of 64.

The Vancouver Bar Association awards the Peter S. Hyndman Mentorship Award each year for a lawyer who has distinguished himself as a mentor to younger lawyers.

References 

1941 births
2006 deaths
British Columbia Social Credit Party MLAs
Canadian political party presidents
Deaths from cancer in British Columbia
Harvard University alumni
Lawyers in British Columbia
Members of the Executive Council of British Columbia
Peter A. Allard School of Law alumni
University of Alberta alumni
St. Andrew's College (Aurora) alumni
20th-century Canadian politicians